D-3 is an uncompressed composite digital video videocassette format invented at NHK and introduced commercially by Panasonic. It was launched in 1991 to compete with Ampex's D-2.

D-3 uses half-inch metal particle tape at 83.88 mm/s (compare to D-2's 19 mm and 131.7 mm/s). Like D-2, the composite video signal is sampled at four times the color subcarrier frequency, with eight bits per sample.  Four channels of 48 kHz 16–20 bit PCM audio, and other ancillary data, are inserted during the vertical blanking interval. The aggregate net (error corrected) bitrate of the format is 143 Mbit/s, and because the codec is lossless, it has been used in data applications.

Camcorders were available which used this format, and are to date the only digital tape camcorders to use a lossless encoding scheme. The D-5 format, introduced in 1993 by Panasonic and marketed as D-5 HD, uses the D-3 transport and tape running at roughly double D-3 speed. The D-3 transport in turn is derived from the MII transport.  D-3/D-5 tapes come in small (161 mm × 96 mm × 25 mm), medium (212 mm × 124 mm × 25 mm), and large (296 mm × 167 mm × 25 mm) cassettes,  with format-specific recognition holes. Maximum D-3 runtimes (in the Fujifilm lineup) are 50, 126, and 248 minutes.

The D-3 format is now regarded as obsolete. In the early 1990s the BBC embarked on a massive project to copy its older video tapes onto D-3 for archival, but the D-3 cassettes themselves have become obsolete and are being transferred to modern digital video standards. There is doubt over whether the surviving D-3 machines will last long enough to play the 340,000 tapes which the corporation holds.

See also
 DVCAM
 DVCPRO
 D-1 (Sony)
 D-2 (video)
 D5 HD
 D6 HDTV VTR

References

External links
 Technical Glossary of Common Audiovisual Terms: D3
 International Association of Broadcasting Manufacturers Technical Reference on Video Tape Recording Formats, January 2000

Video storage
Audiovisual introductions in 1991
Television terminology